The Neal Ranch Formation is a geologic formation in Texas. It preserves fossils dating back to the Permian period.

See also

 List of fossiliferous stratigraphic units in Texas
 Paleontology in Texas

References
 

Geologic formations of Texas
Permian System of North America
Carboniferous southern paleotropical deposits